WVCV is a broadcast radio station licensed to Orange, Virginia, serving Orange and Orange County, Virginia.  WVCV is owned and operated by Piedmont Communications, Inc. and simulcasts the Country format of sister station 103.1 WJMA Culpeper. Prior to February 2016, it had aired a satellite-fed Adult Standards format. WVCV began broadcasting September 10, 1949 as WJMA licensed to Orange, Virginia.

References

External links

WJMA alumni web site

VCV
Radio stations established in 1949
1949 establishments in Virginia
Country radio stations in the United States